Weightlifting returned to the Olympic program at the 1920 Summer Olympics in Antwerp, with competition in five weight classes, for men only.  The sport had previously been contested at the Olympic Games in 1904.

Medal summary

Participating nations
A total of 53 weightlifters from 14 nations competed at the Antwerp Games:

Medal table

References

External links
 

 
1920 Summer Olympics events
1920